Elena Abramovich (born 18 July 1981 in Minsk) is a former Belarusian handball goalkeeper who played for Ferencvárosi TC and the Belarusian national team. Currently she is the goalkeeping coach of MTK Budapest.

She made her international debut on the 2002 European Championship in Denmark.

Achievements
Nemzeti Bajnokság I:
Runner-up: 2012
EHF Cup Winners Cup:
Winner: 2011, 2012

References

External links
 Elena Abramovich player profile on Ferencvárosi TC Official Website

1981 births
Living people
Sportspeople from Minsk
Belarusian female handball players
Expatriate handball players
Belarusian expatriate sportspeople in Hungary